Izano is a rural locality (a selo) in Akhvakhsky District, Republic of Dagestan, Russia. The population was 1,212 as of 2010.

Geography 
Izano is located on the Izanitlar River, 15 km southeast of Karata (the district's administrative centre) by road. Kudiyabroso is the nearest rural locality.

References 

Rural localities in Akhvakhsky District